Casmena is a genus of leaf beetles in the subfamily Eumolpinae. It is distributed in Africa.

Species
 Casmena bicoloripes Pic, 1941
 Casmena calva Burgeon, 1941
 Casmena camerunensis Pic, 1953
 Casmena congoensis Selman, 1972
 Casmena elongata Pic, 1953
 Casmena ghesquierei Burgeon, 1941
 Casmena gracilis Burgeon, 1941
 Casmena humeralis Pic, 1923
 Casmena incerta Pic, 1951
 Casmena minuta Pic, 1952
 Casmena murrayi Chapuis, 1874
 Casmena nigricolor Pic, 1951
 Casmena schoutedeni Pic, 1952
 Casmena sericea Burgeon, 1941
 Casmena subacuminata Pic, 1941
 Casmena unicolor Pic, 1923

References

Eumolpinae
Chrysomelidae genera
Taxa named by Félicien Chapuis
Beetles of Africa